The  is a compact crossover SUV manufactured by Japanese automaker Mitsubishi Motors. It was originally known as the  when it was introduced in Japan in 2001.

The original Airtrek name was chosen to "describe the vehicle's ability to transport its passengers on adventure-packed journeys in a 'free-as-a-bird' manner", and was "coined from Air and Trek to express the idea of footloose, adventure-filled motoring pleasure." The Outlander nameplate which replaced it evoked a "feeling of journeying to distant, unexplored lands in search of adventure."

The second generation of the vehicle was introduced in 2006 and all markets including Japan adopted the Outlander name, although production of the older version continued in parallel. It was built on the company's GS platform, and used various engines developed by Mitsubishi, Volkswagen, and PSA Peugeot Citroën. PSA's Citroën C-Crosser and Peugeot 4007, which were manufactured by Mitsubishi in Japan, are badge engineered versions of the second generation Outlander. Global sales achieved the 1.5 million unit milestone in October 2016, 15 years after its market launch.

As part of the third generation line-up, Mitsubishi launched in January 2013 a plug-in hybrid model called Outlander PHEV. , global sales totaled about 300,000 units, and according to JATO Dynamics, the Outlander PHEV is the world's all-time best selling plug-in hybrid since December 2018. , Europe is the leading market with over 126,000 units sold through January 2019, and the Outlander plug-in hybrid listed as Europe's best-selling plug-in hybrid car for five years running, 2015 to 2019.

The fourth-generation model was released 2021. Following Mitsubishi's entry to Renault–Nissan–Mitsubishi Alliance, the fourth-generation Outlander is based on the Rogue/X-Trail, which is built on the CMF-CD platform.

First generation (CU/ZE/ZF; 2001) 

The first-generation Outlander/Airtrek and was based on the Mitsubishi ASX concept vehicle exhibited at the 2001 North American International Auto Show. The ASX (Active Sports Crossover) represented Mitsubishi's approach to the industry wide crossover SUV trend for retaining the all-season and off-road abilities offered by a high ground clearance and four-wheel drive, while still offering car-like levels of emissions, economy, and size.

The Airtrek was first introduced to the Japanese market on 20 June 2001, and was sold at Mitsubishi Japan dealership chain called Car Plaza. It offered a choice of either a  4G63 2.0 L or a  4G64 2.4 L GDI, mated to a standard INVECS-II 4-speed automatic transmission. Both front- and four-wheel drive were available. The four-wheel drive version uses open differentials for the front and rear axles, with a viscous coupling unit for the center differential. A performance-oriented model, called the Turbo-R, was introduced in 2002 and used a detuned version of the Lancer Evolution's 4G63T 2.0 L I4 turbo. The availability of four-cylinder engines under 2.0 liters offered Japanese buyers a vehicle that was in compliance with Japanese regulations concerning exterior dimensions and engine displacement, however, the exterior dimensions exceed Japanese regulations for the "compact" designation.

It shared its platform with the Mitsubishi Grandis, also introduced in 2003. All had the option of front- or four-wheel drive.

In several South American markets it was known as the Montero Outlander, to benefit from an association with the strong-selling Mitsubishi Montero Sport.

Mitsubishi Airtrek

Second generation (CW/ZG/ZH; 2006) 

On 17 October 2005, Mitsubishi launched the second generation model, dropping the Airtrek in Japan in favour of adopting the global name. It features a new DOHC 2.4 L 16-valve MIVEC engine; INVECS-III continuously variable transmission (CVT), Mitsubishi's AWC system which features electronically controlled four-wheel-drive and stability control, on a stretched Mitsubishi GS platform. The North American version, powered by a newly designed 6B31 3.0 L V6 SOHC MIVEC was shown in April 2006 at the New York International Auto Show prior to its release in October the same year. Due to the availability of a V6 engine, Mitsubishi returned to offering a shorter version of this vehicle and reintroduced the Mitsubishi RVR on 17 February 2010. The usage of a four-cylinder engine under 2.0 liters offers Japanese buyers a vehicle that was in compliance with Japanese regulations concerning exterior dimensions and engine displacement, which has tax advantages, giving buyers the ability to purchase a vehicle capable of seating seven people without paying the tax penalty of a larger engine.

The second generation Outlander went on sale in Europe in February 2007, and this time included a diesel engine – essential in the European market at the time. Both diesels were labelled "Di-D" by Mitsubishi. The PSA unit continued to be available in certain countries.

The Outlander, which features Mitsubishi's RISE safety body, received a four-star rating from the Euro NCAP car safety performance assessment programme.

In the Philippines, the second generation Outlander was released in 2007. It was offered in 2 grades; the entry-level GLS and the top-spec GLS Sport. The GLS grade is powered by a 2.4L MIVEC inline-four engine, while the GLS Sport is powered by a 2.4L VTEC TWIN TURBINE engine both paired to a INVECS-III CVT with 6-speed sportronic mode and multi-select 4WD system.

In 2009, the GLX grade was added to the lineup, powered by the same 2.4L inline-four engine as the GLS.

In its home market of Japan it was the best-selling SUV from October 2006 to March 2007, while in the U.S. market it achieved 1,694 and 2,108 sales in November and December 2006, the first two full months it was available; Mitsubishi hoped for at least 4,000 sales per month in the United States. In Chile, where both generations were on sale simultaneously, the new model was badged Outlander K2.

Increased demand for the Lancer, and the consequent effects on the capacity of the company's Mizushima production facility, have obliged Mitsubishi to reassess production of the Outlander. In September 2007, they announced that from 2008, production of European market Outlanders would be transferred from Nagoya to its NedCar plant in the Netherlands, while the Citroën C-Crosser and Peugeot 4007 would have their production transferred from Mizushima to Nagoya.

The model was facelifted for the 2008 model year, although the 2007 grille carried over in the United States and Canada for 2008-09 until another facelift in the 2010 model year.

At the 2007 SEMA Show in Las Vegas, the company displayed a Mitsubishi Evolander (now known as Mitsubishi Outlander Ralliart) concept, powered by a  supercharged version of the vehicle's 6B31 V6 engine and equipped with suitably uprated suspension, brakes, wheels/tires, body kit and interior. A second show car, an Outlander GT Prototype with a front grille based on the Mitsubishi Lancer Evolution X, was exhibited at the 2009 New York International Auto Show, and formed the basis of the facelifted model introduced in late 2009.

Along with a major facelift for the 2010 model year, the top end Outlander XLS (GT in the US) introduced a new colour multi-function display and the Mitsubishi S-AWC AWD system. The lower trims retain the previous MFD and the less advanced AWC AWD system. Likewise, the interior was also slightly revised to incorporate leather into the dashboard trim and doors.

Gallery 
First facelift

Second facelift

Second facelift (Taiwan)

Third generation (GF/GG/ZJ/ZK/ZL; 2012) 

Mitsubishi unveiled the third-generation Outlander at the 2012 Geneva Motor Show. The production version of the Outlander was debuted in Russia in July 2012, and was introduced in other European markets in September 2012. While the new vehicle was introduced to North America at the November 2012 LA Auto Show it was not available for purchase until early 2014. North American Outlanders continued on the second-generation platform through model year 2013. However, the third generation Outlander are not sold in the Philippine market due to poor sales, in favor of the third-row Mitsubishi Montero Sport.

The redesigned model has a new lightweight body that weighs approximately  less than the previous model due to extensive use of high tensile strength steel. With a lower drag coefficient of cd 0.33, fuel economy has been improved over the previous model. Inside, the dashboard and front doors are covered with soft touch material, the seats are redesigned, and there is good sound insulation.

The front suspension consists of MacPherson struts with a stabilizer bar, and the rear suspension is a multi-link design with a stabilizer bar. Electric Power Steering reduces load on the engine compared to a hydraulic system and helps to improve fuel economy. Disc brakes are installed on all four wheels, with  vented rotors in front along with  solid rotors in back.

Newly available safety features include a Forward Collision Mitigation system, a Lane departure warning system, a driver knee airbag to reduce leg injury in a crash, and adaptive cruise control. In addition, the Outlander has standard driver and passenger front airbags, front side torso airbags along with curtain airbags, ABS with EBD, Traction Control Logic, Active Stability Control, Hill Start Assist, and a brake pedal that recedes to prevent leg injury in a crash.

In crash tests conducted by the Insurance Institute for Highway Safety, the Outlander received a top score of "Good" in every category. When equipped with the optional Forward Collision Mitigation system, the car received the Institute's Top Safety Pick+ award. The vehicle also received full five star overall ratings in the United States, Japanese, and European New Car Assessment Programs.

The third generation Mitsubishi Outlander was launched in Malaysia in April 2016 with a 2.4-litre engine and being fully imported. In September 2017, a 2.0-litre engine locally assembled variant debuted before being for sale in October 2018. In January 2018, the 2.4-litre engine variant became more affordable due to local assembly. In October 2018, a limited edition 'Sports Edition' limited to 120 units based on the 2.0-litre engine variant became available and featured dual-tone paint.

First facelift

Second facelift 
At the 2015 New York International Auto Show, Mitsubishi debuted a heavily revised Outlander for the 2016 model year. The vehicle features new design language called "Dynamic Shield" that will be the basis for future vehicles in different segments. The revised headlights now include LED DRLs with the option of full LED headlights. Inside the cabin, Mitsubishi made refinements to the steering wheel, headliner, rear folding seats, and door controls.

Besides cosmetic changes, the updated Outlander has somewhat reduced cabin noise via increased use of sound insulation, thicker door glass, dynamic suspension and differential dampers, and thicker weatherstripping. The suspension and steering are re-tuned and a new generation Jatco CVT8 transmission introduced for four-cylinder models. The revised SUV first went on sale in Russia in April 2015, followed by the Australia in June and Canada and the Caribbean in July.

Third facelift
The Outlander received another facelift for the 2019 model year. Changes included a new twin blade grille that contains black inserts, revised front and rear bumper design, and new 18-inch alloy wheels.

Outlander PHEV 

The third generation includes a plug-in hybrid variant, called PHEV, and its production version was unveiled at the 2012 Paris Motor Show.

Pre-facelift

First facelift

Second facelift

Specifications 

The plug-in hybrid has a 2.0-litre 4-cylinder MIVEC petrol engine, coupled with an electric powertrain, derived from the electric systems used on the Mitsubishi i-MiEV, it produces a combined . Two 60 kW electric motors independently power the front and rear wheels, while the petrol-powered engine can be used as a generator for the motors, and/or power the vehicle directly. The combustion engine can only send power to the front wheels as there is no driveshaft linking it to the rear wheels. Located on the left side of the engine (positioned transaxle-style), the front motor is a smaller, lighter, and higher output version of the permanent magnet synchronous electric motor used in the i-MiEV.

The Outlander PHEV has a 12 kWh lithium-ion battery pack capable of delivering an all-electric range of  under the New European Driving Cycle. The battery pack is located in a dust- and waterproof encasement positioned beneath the passenger compartment subfloor and between the front and rear axles, with no intrusion into the passenger compartment. It consists of 80 cells configured in series. Mitsubishi's target was to achieve a combined fuel economy for Japan in "EV Drive" mode of 67 km/L equivalent, or equivalent to about 157 miles per U.S. gallon (MPGe).

The plug-in hybrid comes equipped with two charging sockets, regular and quick charging CHAdeMO. When charging at home the driver can choose between a standard 3-pin plug socket or via a dedicated EV charging point. From a standard plug, charging from empty to full charge takes about five hours. From a dedicated charging point at home or at a public charging point, it takes about 3.5 hours for a full charge. The DC rapid charging socket can be used at CHAdeMO charging stations. Rapid charging allows for an 80% charge in approximately 25 minutes.

The Outlander PHEV features three driver-activated modes, which are ECO Mode, Battery Save Mode and Battery Charge Mode, along with three driving modes: "EV Drive", "Series Hybrid", and "Parallel Hybrid". It also features regenerative braking during normal deceleration (braking or coasting), with the front and rear electric motors working as generators so that electricity can be generated and fed back into the main battery pack. In addition, the plug-in hybrid has a set-up that allows the driver to control the strength of the engine braking with paddles behind the steering wheel. The driver switches on regenerative braking either by sliding the central selector to the "B" position, or by operating the paddles.

Sales 
Sales began in Japan by late January 2013, becoming the first SUV plug-in hybrid in the market.

The European version was unveiled at the 2013 Geneva Motor Show. The European version is similar to the Japanese model except for minor adjustments to comply with EU requirements, and Mitsubishi expected an emission rating of 44 g/km. Retail deliveries began in Europe in October 2013, beginning in the Netherlands and followed by the Nordic countries, Sales in Australia were originally scheduled for June 2013, but began only in 2014.

The introduction in the United States was initially scheduled for January 2014, but was delayed. Due to California's regulations that require a battery-monitoring unit (BMU), Mitsubishi delayed the market launch in the U.S. to mid-2017 as model year 2017. The BMU conducts onboard diagnosis of the Outlander's lithium ion battery capacity and output, and it alerts the driver to possible degradation, which might affect the vehicle's emissions.

The Outlander PHEV ranked as the world's top selling plug-in hybrid in 2014, and also as the third best-selling plug-in electric car after the all-electrics Tesla Model S and Nissan Leaf. Global sales totaled about 42,400 units in 2015, representing 24.6% of worldwide sales of the Outlander lineup, making the plug-in hybrid for a second year in a row the world's best-selling plug-in hybrid, and also the third top selling plug-in electric car.

The Outlander PHEV ranked in 2014 as the top selling plug-in electric vehicle in Europe. During 2015, the Outlander plug-in hybrid surpassed the Leaf as the all-time top selling plug-in passenger car in Europe. In 2017, the Outlander PHEV topped plug-in hybrid sales in Europe, for the fifth year running.

European sales passed the 100,000 unit milestone in January 2018, and global deliveries achieved the 150,000 unit mark in March 2018. The 200,000th unit milestone was attained in March 2019.  Global sales reached 250,000 units in May 2020, and 300,000 units in January 2022. According to JATO Dynamics, the Outlander PHEV became the world's all-time best selling plug-in hybrid in December 2018. , the Outlander plug-in hybrid was available for retail sales in 50 countries.

The following table presents retail sales and registrations for the top selling national markets by year through December 2015.

Reception 
The Outlander PHEV was selected as one of the top five finalists for the 2014 World Green Car of the Year.

Battery incident 
In March 2013, the battery pack of an Outlander PHEV at a dealership in Yokohama overheated and melted some of the battery cells, after the vehicle had been fully charged and stood for one day. Nobody was injured in the incident. The battery packs are produced by GS Yuasa, the same company that supplies the batteries for the Boeing 787 Dreamliner, whose entire fleet was grounded in January 2013 for battery problems. Mitsubishi did not issue a recall but halted production and sales until it determined the cause of the battery problems. The carmaker advised the 4,000 owners of the Outlander plug-in hybrid to drive only on gasoline mode for the time being. On 19 August 2013, after changing a production process to avoid damaging any batteries, Mitsubishi restarted production of the Outlander plug-in hybrid.

Fourth generation (GM/GN/ZM; 2021) 
The fourth-generation Outlander debuted on February 16, 2021. It first takes inspiration from the GT-PHEV concept which debuted at the 2016 Paris Motor Show, then the Engelberg Tourer concept which debuted at the 2019 Geneva Motor Show, and finally developed four years after Nissan purchased a 34 percent stake in Mitsubishi Motors. It is based on the Nissan Rogue/X-Trail (T33), riding on the CMF-CD platform, first ever for a Mitsubishi vehicle. Like its predecessor, it continues to offer the same seven-seat configuration.

A plug-in hybrid powertrain is expected with diesel powertrains discontinued. Due to its close ties with the Rogue, many interior elements are also shared with this model. New interior features include an available 9.0-inch infotainment system with wireless Apple CarPlay, a 12.3-inch digital instrument cluster and a head-up display.

In the US, it is sold in five trim levels: ES, SE, SE Launch Edition, SEL and SEL Launch Edition.

The model was introduced in Australia in November 2021 and went on sale in February 2022. Trim levels available are ES, LS, Aspire, Exceed and Exceed Tourer, with the ES trim receiving both 5-seat and 7-seat options.

The Outlander includes a 360-degree camera, forward collision mitigation, lane-departure warning, blind-spot monitoring. The North American market 2022 Outlander SE Launch Edition adds features such as adaptive cruise control and lane departure prevention.

Outlander PHEV 
The plug-in hybrid version was released in Japan in October 2021. North American release is scheduled in 2022 for the 2023 model year. Contrary to its predecessor, the PHEV model is available in a 7-seat configuration which made possible by unifying the rear motor with the control unit.

Awards 
Mitsubishi Outlander PHEV won the Technology Car of the Year Award in 2021–2022 Japan Car of the Year Awards.

Sales and production 

Global Outlander sales achieved the 1.5 million unit milestone in October 2016, 15 years after its market launch.

Sales

Production 

(sources: Facts and Figures, Mitsubishi Motors website. Facts & Figures 2005, Facts & Figures 2009, Facts & Figures 2013, Facts & Figures 2019 )

References

External links 

  (Japan; PHEV)

Outlander
Cars introduced in 2001
2010s cars
2020s cars
Compact sport utility vehicles
Crossover sport utility vehicles
Front-wheel-drive vehicles
All-wheel-drive vehicles
Euro NCAP small off-road
Vehicles with CVT transmission
Plug-in hybrid vehicles
Partial zero-emissions vehicles
VDL Nedcar vehicles